Ploudiry is a commune in the Finistère department of Brittany in north-western France.

Population
Inhabitants of Ploudiry are called in French
Ploudiriens.

See also
Communes of the Finistère department
Ploudiry Parish close

References

External links
Official website 

Mayors of Finistère Association 

Communes of Finistère
Finistère communes articles needing translation from French Wikipedia